Knapp Brook is a river that flows into the Mohawk River by West Schuyler, New York.

Water quality
Streambank erosion on Knapp Brook contributes sediment loads into the Erie Canal. Periodic dredging to restore adequate canal navigational depth causes further siltation and affects fish habitat.

References 

Rivers of Herkimer County, New York
Mohawk River
Rivers of New York (state)